Htun Htun Oo; also spelled Tun Tun Oo is a Burmese name and may refer to:

Htun Htun Oo (attorney-general) 
Htun Htun Oo (chief justice)
Htun Htun Oo (politician) born 1961